Hologerrhum is a genus of snakes in the family Cyclocoridae.

Geographic range
The genus Hologerrhum is endemic to the Philippines.

Species
The genus Hologerrhum contains two species which are recognized as being valid.
Hologerrhum dermali 
Hologerrhum philippinum

References

Further reading
Günther A (1858). Catalogue of the Colubrine Snakes in the Collection of the British Museum. London: Trustees of the British Museum. (Taylor and Francis, printers). xvi + 281 pp. (Hologerrhum, new genus, p. 186; H. philippinum, new species, pp. 186–187).

Snake genera
Cyclocoridae
Taxa named by Albert Günther